Amani Elijah Bledsoe  (born February 6, 1998) is an American football defensive end for the Atlanta Falcons of the National Football League (NFL). He played college football at Oklahoma and was signed by the Titans as an undrafted free agent in 2019. He has also played for the Cincinnati Bengals.

College career
Bledsoe was a member of the Oklahoma Sooners for three seasons, losing a year of eligibility to a failed drug test. He declared for the 2019 NFL Draft after his junior year. Bledsoe finished his collegiate career with 59 tackles, 7.5 tackles for loss and four sacks.

Professional career

Tennessee Titans
Bledsoe was signed by the Tennessee Titans as an undrafted free agent on April 27, 2019. He was waived during final roster cuts and then re-signed to the team's practice squad, where he remained for the rest of the season. The Titans waived Bledsoe on July 26, 2020.

Cincinnati Bengals

Bledsoe was signed by the Cincinnati Bengals on August 15, 2020. Bledsoe was waived during final roster cuts on September 5, 2020, and signed to the team's practice squad the next day. He was elevated to the active roster for the season opener against the Los Angeles Chargers on September 13, 2020, and reverted to the practice squad the next day. Bledsoe was promoted to the active roster on September 15, 2020. He was placed on the reserve/COVID-19 list by the team on December 6, 2020, and activated on December 16.

Bledsoe re-signed on a one-year contract with the Bengals on March 31, 2021. He was waived on August 31, 2021.

Tennessee Titans (second stint)
On September 2, 2021, Bledsoe was signed to the Tennessee Titans practice squad. He was promoted to the active roster on October 8, 2021. He was waived on November 15 and re-signed to the practice squad.

On February 23, 2022, Bledsoe was suspended for six games by the NFL after violating the league's performance enhancing drug policy.

Atlanta Falcons
On November 1, 2022, Bledsoe was signed to the Atlanta Falcons practice squad. He signed a reserve/future contract on January 9, 2023.

References

External links
Tennessee Titans bio
Oklahoma Sooners bio

1998 births
Living people
Players of American football from Kansas
American football defensive ends
Oklahoma Sooners football players
Cincinnati Bengals players
Tennessee Titans players
Atlanta Falcons players